Leone Strozzi (15 October 1515 – 28 June 1554) was an Italian condottiero belonging to the famous Strozzi family of Florence.

Biography
He was the son of Filippo Strozzi the Younger and Clarice de' Medici, and brother to Piero, Roberto and Lorenzo Strozzi.

After his father's defeat in the Battle of Montemurlo, Strozzi fled with his brothers to France, at the court of Catherine de' Medici. Later he fought against Cosimo I de' Medici at Siena, but was again defeated.

In 1530, Strozzi became a knight of the Order of Malta, for which he was Prior in Capua. In 1536, he was named commander of the galleys of the Order, a position he held again in 1552. In August 1547 he captured St Andrews Castle in Scotland from the Protestant Lairds of Fife who had killed David Beaton. The lairds knew an expert was in the field when they observed cannon being winched into position with ropes rather than exposing the besiegers to their fire.

Strozzi died in the siege of Scarlino, in Tuscany, during the unsuccessful defence of Republic of Siena against Florence and the Holy Roman Empire, shot by an arquebus ball.

Ancestry

Footnotes

References
 Landi, Fausto: Gli ultimi anni della Repubblica di Siena 1525 - 1555, Edizioni Cantagalli, Siena 1994

See also
Condottieri
Italian Wars
Battle of Marciano

1515 births
1554 deaths
Leone
16th-century condottieri
French Navy admirals
Deaths by firearm in Italy
Italian military personnel killed in action
Italian people of the Rough Wooing
Italian expatriates in Scotland